Fábio Leopoldo Silva (born April 17, 1977 in São Paulo) is a former Brazilian mixed martial artist and is currently an active Brazilian Jiu-Jitsu practitioner and instructor.

Career
After graduating college with a degree in International Business, Leopoldo started his own Brazilian Jiu-Jitsu academy in São Paulo, Brazil called Gracie Morumbi. He has been the owner and primary instructor at the academy since it was established in 1999. Since then he has opened two more academies in the United States. One is in Ventura, California, and the other is in Thousand Oaks, California.

Leopoldo is a total six-time world champion in Brazilian Jiu-Jitsu, two-time Brazilian champion, and seven-time Pan American champion. He also recently won the gold in the IBJJF International Masters..

Brazilian Jiu-Jitsu accomplishments
4x World Champion (1998 - purple belt, 2000 – brown belt, 2002 – black belt, 2019 - black belt master division)
2x World Champion No Gi Master Division (2013, 2018 - black belt)
6x Pan American Champion (2000 – brown, 2002 weight & absolute, 2010 master, 2011 master, 2013 master, 2019 master open division)
2x Brazilian National Champion (2001 – black belt, 2019 - black belt)
2x World Silver Medalist (1998 – purple belt, 1999 – brown belt, 2008 – black belt)
6x Pan American Silver Medalist (1996 – purple belt, 2000 – brown belt absolute, 2001 black belt absolute, 2003, 2009 weight & absolute – master, 2019 weight division)
Brazilian National Silver Medalist (1997 – blue belt)
3x World Bronze Medallist (2001 – black belt, 2003, 2005)
2x Pan American Bronze Medallist (1998 – purple belt, 2001 black belt)
3x Brazilian National Bronze Medallist (1999 – brown belt, 2000 – black belt, 2005)

Mixed martial arts record

|-
| Loss
| align=center| 5-3
| Ryan McGivern
| TKO (punches)
| IFL: 2007 Team Championship
| 
| align=center| 2
| align=center| 1:35
| Hollywood, Florida, United States
| 
|-
| Loss
| align=center| 5-2
| Brent Beauparlant
| TKO (injury)
| IFL – Las Vegas
| 
| align=center| 3
| align=center| 2:22
| Las Vegas, Nevada, United States
| 
|-
| Win
| align=center| 5-1
| Gerald Harris
| Decision (split)
| IFL: Connecticut
| 
| align=center| 3
| align=center| 4:00
| Uncasville, Connecticut, United States
| 
|-
| Win
| align=center| 4-1
| Chris Albandia
| Submission (guillotine choke)
| IFL: Atlanta
| 
| align=center| 1
| align=center| 1:48
| Atlanta, Georgia, United States
| 
|-
| Win
| align=center| 3-1
| Ryan McGivern
| Submission (kneebar)
| IFL: Gracie vs. Miletich
| 
| align=center| 2
| align=center| 2:49
| Moline, Illinois, United States
| 
|-
| Loss
| align=center| 2-1
| Matt Lindland
| Submission (rear naked choke)
| Gracie Fighting Championships: Team Gracie vs Team Hammer House
| 
| align=center| 3
| align=center| 3:25
| Columbus, Ohio, United States
| 
|-
| Win
| align=center| 2-0
| Yuki Sasaki
| Decision (majority)
| Pancrase: 2004 Neo-Blood Tournament Semifinals
| 
| align=center| 3
| align=center| 5:00
| Tokyo, Japan
| 
|-
| Win
| align=center| 1-0
| Brendan Seguin
| TKO (punches)
| MMA: Eruption
| 
| align=center| 1
| align=center| 0:43
| Lowell, Massachusetts, United States
|

References

External links
 
 

1977 births
Living people
Brazilian male mixed martial artists
Middleweight mixed martial artists
Mixed martial artists utilizing Brazilian jiu-jitsu
Brazilian practitioners of Brazilian jiu-jitsu
Sportspeople from São Paulo
People awarded a black belt in Brazilian jiu-jitsu